Fischingen may refer to:

Fischingen, a municipality in the district of Münchwilen in the canton of Thurgau in Switzerland
Fischingen Abbey, a Benedictine monastery situated in Fischingen in the Canton of Thurgau, Switzerland
Fischingen, Baden-Württemberg, a town in the district of Lörrach in Baden-Württemberg in Germany